The year 1885 in architecture involved some significant architectural events and new buildings.

Events
 May – The original wooden structures of Hobson Block, West Union, Iowa, USA, are destroyed by fire, leading to construction of the present building.
 W. D. Caröe is appointed architect to the Ecclesiastical Commissioners for England.
 Construction of the Altare della Patria (Monumento Nazionale a Vittorio Emanuele II) in Rome, designed by Giuseppe Sacconi, begins; it will not be completed until 1925.

Buildings and structures

Buildings opened
 July 13 – New building for the Rijksmuseum in Amsterdam, designed by Pierre Cuypers.
 November 30 – London Pavilion variety theatre, designed by Robert Worley and James Ebenezer Saunders.
 December 27 – Church of St. Peter, Leipzig, designed by August Hartel and Constantin Lipsius.
 Castle Hotel, Conwy, Wales.
 Church of Saint Anthony of Padua, Busovača, Bosnia-Herzegovina.
 Vestermarie Church, Bornholm, Denmark.
 Metropole Hotel, London, designed by Francis Fowler and James Ebenezer Saunders.

Buildings completed

 Autumn – The Home Insurance Building in Chicago, Illinois, designed by William Le Baron Jenney. With ten floors and a fireproof weight-bearing metal frame, it is regarded as the first skyscraper.
 Academy of Athens (Greece), designed by Theophil Hansen in 1859.
 Holloway Sanatorium near Virginia Water in England, designed by William Henry Crossland.
 Sway Tower in Hampshire, England, designed by Andrew Peterson using concrete made with Portland cement. It remains the world's tallest non-reinforced concrete structure.
 House for Kate Greenaway, Frognal, London, designed by Richard Norman Shaw.
 Elmside (house), Grange Road, Cambridge, England, designed by Edward Prior.
 Rebuilt Framingham Railroad Station in Framingham, Massachusetts, designed by H. H. Richardson.

Awards
 RIBA Royal Gold Medal – Heinrich Schliemann.
 Grand Prix de Rome, architecture: François Paul André.

Births
 February 23 – Yoshikazu Uchida, Japanese architect and structural engineer (died 1972)
 July 13 – Adolf Behne, German art historian, architectural writer and leader of the Avant Garde movement (died 1948)
 July 15 – Josef Frank, Austrian-born architect and designer (died 1967)
 July 29 – Sigurd Lewerentz, Swedish architect and furniture designer (died 1975)
 August 13 – Charles Howard Crane, American architect (died 1952)
 August 30 – Paul Gösch, German Expressionist artist, architect, lithographer and designer (died 1940)
 September 22 – Gunnar Asplund, Swedish "Nordic Classicist" architect (died 1940)
 December 5 – Ernest Cormier, Canadian engineer and architect (died 1980)
 December 17 – Wells Coates, Canadian architect, designer and writer (died 1958)
 December 28 – Vladimir Tatlin, Russian painter and architect (died 1953)

Deaths
 February 1 – Henri Dupuy de Lôme, French naval architect (born 1816)
 March 9 – Matthew Ellison Hadfield, English Victorian Gothic architect (born 1812)
 May 22 – Théodore Ballu, French architect of public buildings (born 1817)
 May 28 – Horace King, US architect, engineer, and bridge builder.
 June 14 – William Tinsley, US-based Irish architect (born 1804)
 August 1 – Thomas Leverton Donaldson, British architect, co-founder and President of the Royal Institute of British Architects
 August 24 – Eduard Riedel, German architect and Bavarian government building officer (born 1813)
 September 2 – Giuseppe Bonavia, Maltese architect (born 1821)
 November 16 – Frederick Ernst Ruffini, US architect (born 1851)

References

Architecture
Years in architecture
19th-century architecture